The role of a Turkey national football team manager was first established in 1923 with the appointment of Ali Sami Yen. The most successful manager is Fatih Terim, he managed the national team in 136 matches, winning 70 matches. Guus Hiddink holds the record as the highest paid national team manager in the history of Turkish football.

Statistics

References

Turkey national team managers (TFF) 
RSSSF.com – Turkey national team coaches

Turkey